Apparao Palem is a village in Atmakur, Nellore district, Andhra Pradesh, India. It is locally governed with a gram panchayat. The main occupation in the village is agriculture. Apparaopalem is on the banks of the Penna River. Paddy fields and mango orchards are commonly seen in the area.

References 

Villages in Nellore district